Kalinga Institute of Social Sciences (KISS), informally KISS University, is a higher education institute deemed-to-be-university located in Bhubaneswar, Odisha, India. It was established in 1993 as a residential tribal school and became a deemed-to-be-university in 2017.

History 
KISS was founded in 1993 by Achyuta Samanta as a residential tribal school. In 2017 the institute was awarded a university status.

Satya S. Tripathi was appointed chancellor in 2021 and Deepak Kumar Behera was appointed vice-chancellor.

Academic 
The university offers bachelors, masters and doctorate degrees.

Bachelor degree 
Admission into bachelor's degree are channelized into Arts, Science and Commerce streams (all Hons.) and all streams are focus on the tribal studies ( Culture, Philosophy, Heritage, Science & Technology, Linguistics & Literature, Resource Management, Legal Studies & Rights) aspects.

Master degree 
There are 7 master's degree departments.
Department of Tribal Culture, Philosophy & Eco-Spiritualism
Department of Tribal Heritage & Tribal Indology 
Department of Comparative Tribal Linguistics & Literature 
Department of Tribal Legal Studies & Tribal Rights
Department of Indigenous Knowledge Science & Technology 
Department of Comparative Indic Studies & Tribal Science
Department of Tribal Resource Management

Ph.D. / M.Phil. 

Tribal Culture, Philosophy and Eco-Spiritualism
Tribal Heritage and Tribal Indology 
Comparative Tribal Linguistics and Literature 
Tribal Legal Studies and Tribal Rights 
Indigenous Knowledge Science and Technology 
Comparative Indic Studies and Tribal Science 
Tribal Resource Management

References

External links 
 

Colleges in India
1993 establishments in Orissa
Educational institutions established in 1993
Khordha district